Faces of Love is a 1977 Swiss French drama directed by Michel Soutter. The film, about three actresses in a film of Chekhov's Three Sisters and their relationship with a film director, has autobiographical references.

Cast
 Jean-Louis Trintignant as Victor
 Delphine Seyrig as Julie
 Lea Massari as Cecilia
 Valérie Mairesse as Esther
 Roger Jendly as Jean Vallée
 François Rochaix as Ambrosio

Accolades

References

External links
 

French drama films
1977 drama films
1977 films
Gaumont Film Company films
Films based on Three Sisters
Films about actors
1970s French-language films
1970s French films